The American Composers Alliance (ACA) is an American nonprofit composer service organization dedicated to the publishing and promoting of American contemporary classical music.  Founded in 1937 by Aaron Copland, Milton Adolphus, Marion Bauer and others, it is the oldest national organization of its kind, and represents over 200 member composers.

The organization is based in Manhattan, New York City, New York. From 1951, ACA presented the Laurel Leaf Award to individuals and organizations in recognition of "distinguished achievement in fostering and encouraging American music."

The American Composers Alliance publishes musical scores under the imprint American Composers Edition (ACE).  From 2001 through 2013, ACA held  an annual festival of American music  presenting 6-8 concerts with more than 30 composers from across the country. Past festivals received favorable reviews from The New York Times and New Music Connoisseur. In 2017, ACA celebrated its 80th anniversary.

Affiliation with American Composers Alliance (ACA)
Composers seeking services from American Composers Alliance must be affiliated with Broadcast Music Inc. (BMI) or ASCAP.
Any US citizen or US permanent resident may apply for membership. There are no stylistic requirements.
The composer must be writing contemporary classical music, at a professional level.

The composer submits electronically a minimum of two recent scores, two recordings (live or studio), a complete list of works (with instrumentation, duration, and premiere performance info),along with a bio, resume, or curriculum vitae that contains performance information for the last three years. A committee from ACA’s Board of Governors reviews this material and then makes a recommendation to the full Board, which determines acceptance for works into the ACA Catalog. The process can take from 2 to 3 months.

If the composer's work is accepted into the ACA Catalog, an agreement, a Grant of Rights for the selected works, see copyright, is signed. This Agreement gives ACA administration and publishing rights.  The Agreement may be terminated by the composer or by the ACA Board of  Governors with reasonable notice. Control of copyright remains with the composer.

ACA Affiliated Composers as of 2019
Adams, H. Leslie 
Anderson, T. J. 
Auerbach-Brown, Christopher 
Austin, Elizabeth
Awad, Emil
Balazs, Frederic 
Bassett, Leslie 
Bauer, Ross 
Beerman, Burton 
Bell (Friou), Elizabeth 
Berenholtz, Jim 
Bevelander, Brian 
Bliss, Marilyn 
Block, Steven D. 
Bottje, Will Gay
Boykan, Martin 
 Brooks, Richard 
Cameron-Wolfe, Richard 
Carl, Robert
Carlsen, Philip 
Chenoweth, Gerald 
Chow, Jun Yi 
Cohen, Fred 
Cory, Eleanor 
Costinescu, Gheorghe 
Davidson, Matthew de Lacey 
Dellaira, Michael
Dillon, Lawrence
Flaherty, Tom 
Froom, David 
Gibson, John Grant 
Gibson, Robert L. 
Gilbert, Janet
Gordon, David E.
Greenbaum, Matthew 
Greenberg, Laura 
Gressel. Joel 
Hall, Gregory
Hodkinson, Sydney 
Howe, Hubert 
Hutcheson, Jere 
Jacobs, Edward S. 
Jankowski, Loretta 
Jazwinski, Barbara 
Jones, David Evan 
Karchin, Louis S. 
Kim, Sunbin 
Kreiger, Arthur
Kroeger, Karl 
Lennon, John Anthony  
Liptak , David
Lipten, David 
Lovendusky , James 
Raymond Luedeke 
Lundborg , Erik 
McCandless, Richard 
McKinley , Dr. Elliott Miles 
McLoskey, Lansing 
Melby, John 
Meneely-Kyder, Sarah
Miller, Scott L 
Moore, Dorothy Rudd 
Newell, Robert Max 
Nielson, Lewis J. 
Nowak, Alison 
Oliver, Harold 
Perlongo, Daniel 
Philo, Gary
 Pisk, Paul
Rausch, Carlos 
Read, Thomas L. 
Rhodes, Phillip 
Rockmaker, Jody 
Rothkopf, Michael S. 
Sacco, Steven Christopher  
Sapp, Allen
Schneider, Gary 
Schober, Brian 
Schwartz, Elliott 
Sherman, Elna 
Shields, Alice 
Shrude, Marilyn   
Shultis, Christopher L.  
Silsbee, Ann Loomis 
Slayton, Michael 
Sollberger, Harvey 
Stallcop, Glenn 
Suben, Joel Eric 
Suber, Stephen Carter 
Suskind, Joyce Hope
Tacke, Daniel
Taylor, Dean
Thomas, Andrew William 
Thome, Mark (David) 
Thompson, Robert Scott 
Tillis, Frederick C.
Tower, Joan 
Van Nostrand, Burr
Vogel, Roger C. 
Welch, Matthew 
Wellman, Samuel
Westergaard, Peter 
Wiemann, Beth 
Wilson, Donald M. 
Wuorinen, Charles 
Yttrehus, Rolv 
Zahler, Noel
Ziolek, Eric 
Zuckerman, Mark
Zupko, Ramon 
'American Composers Alliance'

See also
American Composers Forum

External links
American Composers Alliance 
Apply for Administrative and Publishing Services through American Composers Edition 
Broadcast Music Incorporated 
ACA on Facebook 

1937 establishments in the United States
Classical music in the United States
Contemporary music organizations